General Sir John Grenfell Maxwell,  (11 July 1859 – 21 February 1929) was a British Army officer and colonial governor. He served in the Mahdist War in the Sudan, the Second Boer War, and in the First World War. As Commander-in-Chief, Ireland, he played a key part in the response to the 1916 Easter Rising, including overseeing the courts-martial after the rebellion. Maxwell retired in 1922.

Early life
Maxwell was born in Aigburth, Liverpool, on 11 July 1859 to a family of Scottish Protestant heritage. He attended school at Cheltenham College, studied at the Royal Military College, Sandhurst, from 1878 and was commissioned into the 42nd foot (Royal Highlanders) in 1879.

Military career
Maxwell served with the Black Watch in the Anglo-Egyptian War of 1882, taking part in the storming of the Egyptian fortifications at Tel-El-Kabir and rising to the rank of captain. He was first mentioned in despatches as an assistant provost-marshal and camp commandant during the Nile Expedition of 1884–1885. He played an active role with the Egyptian frontier forces in the Sudan, and won a Distinguished Service Order in the engagement at Ginnis and was also present in the battle at Gemaizah in 1888 where he was made brevet lieutenant colonel. During the reconquest of Sudan he led the 2nd Egyptian Brigade, and was present at the 1898 Battles of the Atbara and Omdurman, where he was among the first to enter the Khalifa's palace. In 1897 he was appointed Governor of Nubia and in 1898 was appointed Governor of Omdurman. For his services in Egypt, he received in early 1900 the 2nd class of the Order of the Medjidie from the Ottoman Sultan.

Boer War
Maxwell served in South Africa during the Second Boer War (1899–1902). He departed Southampton in the SS Mexican in February 1900, and arrived in Cape Town the following month to take up a staff appointment. He commanded the 14th Brigade on Lord Roberts' march to Pretoria, and after the city's successful occupation served as Military Governor of Pretoria and the Western Transvaal from 1900 to March 1902, when he relinquished the office to allow for gradual extension of civilian rule. As governor, he filled a difficult post "with great tact and ability ... gained the confidence and esteem of the general public" according to a contemporary news report. After leaving Pretoria he held a command in the Western district, before returning to the United Kingdom in July 1902, a month after the end of the war. In his final despatch from South Africa in June 1902, the Commander-in-Chief Lord Kitchener described Maxwell as an officer with "an energetic mind, and a sound judgment, which, coupled with his kindly and considerate disposition, have enabled him to render valuable service". For his service in the war, he was appointed a Knight Commander of the Order of the Bath (KCB) in the April 1901 South African Honours list (the order was dated to 29 November 1900) and a Companion of the Order of St Michael and St George (CMG) in the 1902 Coronation Honours list, and was invested to both orders after his return home, by King Edward VII at Buckingham Palace on 24 October 1902.

After his return, Maxwell was in November 1902 appointed Chief Staff Officer of the Third Army Corps stationed in Ireland, with promotion to the substantive rank of colonel but to hold the temporary rank of brigadier general on the Staff. In August 1903 he was made a Commander of the Royal Victorian Order for assisting with King Edward VII's 1903 visit to Ireland. Maxwell accompanied the Duke of Connaught to Coburg for the coming-of-age celebrations of Charles Edward, Duke of Saxe-Coburg and Gotha, in July 1905, and in September 1906 visited Silesia to observe the maneuvers of the Imperial German Army before continuing on to Baden. In September 1907 they visited Vienna to review the Duke's Austrian regiment, where he was awarded the Grand Cross of the Order of Franz Joseph.

First World War 
He became General Officer Commanding British Troops in Egypt in 1908, and was deployed on the Western Front at the start of the First World War.

He returned to the Egyptian Command in late 1914. On November 2, 1914, after the Ottoman Empire entered the war, General Maxwell announced measures censoring the press in Egypt, causing a paucity in the Arabic press as many Arabic periodicals, such as Ahmed Lutfi es-Sayed's Al Jarida, dwindled or ceased publication. He successfully held the Suez Canal against the Ottoman Raid on the Suez Canal.

In September 1915 General Godley at Gallipoli complained that too few of the recovered sick or wounded casualties from Gallipoli were being returned from Egypt, and Maxwell commented to Godley that "the appetite of the Dardanelles for men has been phenomenal and wicked".

Easter Rising

After the Easter Rising, a rebellion against British rule in Ireland, broke out on 24 April 1916, Lord Lieutenant of Ireland Lord Wimborne declared both the city and county of Dublin to be in a state of martial law. Concurrently, the British government implemented measures to allow for the court-martial of persons in Ireland found to be breaching the Defence of the Realm Act (DORA), which was passed in the British Parliament on 8 August 1914. Maxwell arrived in Dublin on 28 April, replacing Lovick Friend as Commander-in-Chief, Ireland and arriving just in time to accept the surrender by the rebels. Granted plenary powers by his superiors, Maxwell was made temporary military governor of Ireland and publicly proclaimed his intent "to arrest all dangerous Sinn Feiners", including "those who have taken an active part in the movement although not in the present rebellion."

3,430 men and 79 women were subsequently arrested, including 425 people for looting. A series of courts-martial presided over by Charles Blackader began on 2 May, in which 187 people were tried, most of them at Richmond Barracks. Controversially, Maxwell decided that the courts-martial would be held in camera and without a defence counsel or jury, which Crown law officers later ruled to have been illegal. Some of those officers who conducted the trials had commanded troops involved in suppressing the rebellion, a conflict of interest that the British Military Manual prohibited. Ninety were sentenced to death; fifteen of those (including all seven signatories of the Proclamation) had their sentences confirmed by Maxwell and fourteen were executed by firing squad at Kilmainham Gaol between 3 and 12 May.

However, British Prime Minister H. H. Asquith and his cabinet soon became concerned with the speed and secrecy of events, and intervened in order to stop more executions. In particular, there was concern that DORA regulations for courts-martial were not being applied. These regulations called for a full court of thirteen members, a professional judge, a legal advocate, and for the proceedings to be held in public, provisions which could have prevented some of the executions. Maxwell admitted in a report to Asquith in June that the impression that the leaders were killed in cold blood and without a trial had resulted in a "revulsion of feeling" that had emerged in favour of the rebels, and was the result of the confusion between applying DORA as opposed to martial law (which Maxwell had actually pressed for from the beginning). As a result, Maxwell had the remaining death sentences commuted to penal servitude. Although Asquith had promised to publish the court martial proceedings, the transcripts were not made public until 1999. Leaving for England later in 1916, this was Maxwell's last posting in Ireland.

Post–1916

In 1916 Maxwell was assigned to be General Officer Commanding, Northern Command, at York. He was promoted in June 1919 to full general and he retired in 1922. He died on 21 February 1929 and his memorial is in the crypt of York Minster.

Personal life
Maxwell married in 1892 Louise Selina Bonynge, daughter of Charles Bonynge, and had one daughter.

During his time in Egypt, Maxwell developed an interest in archaeology. He was a member of the Egypt Exploration Society, becoming its president after he retired from the army. Through the Society, Maxwell knew Lord Carnarvon and was an executor of his will. In this capacity, Maxwell advised Lady Carnarvon on taking on her late husband's concession to excavate Tutankhamun's tomb, and advised both her and Howard Carter on the management of various legal disputes with the Egyptian authorities.

Legacy
After 1916, the German medallist Walther Eberbach issued a satirical medal mocking Maxwell's handling of the Rising.

On 16 March 1929, Maxwell's ashes were placed in the crypt in York Minster. His body was cremated in London but because he served as a general for the Northern Command at York, it was thought that York was the best resting place for the soldier. His ashes were placed in an urn, the urn was placed into a casket and the casket was placed into a bigger casket to act as a coffin. His ashes were taken by train from London to York and were escorted by military personnel to York Minster. The casket containing his ashes was placed in a cavity in the ground in front of the crypt altar. The ceremony was officiated by The Dean of York. This was the first time such a ceremony had taken place in York Minster.

In May 2011 Maxwell's orders and medals were auctioned by Dixon Noonan Webb in London, they realising £26,000 to an unnamed bidder.

References

External links

 His introduction to The New Zealanders in Sinai and Palestine

|-

|-

|-

1859 births
1929 deaths
British Army generals
42nd Regiment of Foot officers
Black Watch officers
British Army personnel of the Mahdist War
British Army personnel of the Second Boer War
British Army generals of World War I
Commanders of the Royal Victorian Order
Commanders-in-Chief, Ireland
Companions of the Distinguished Service Order
English people of Scottish descent
Graduates of the Royal Military College, Sandhurst
Knights Grand Cross of the Order of the Bath
Knights Commander of the Order of St Michael and St George
Grand Crosses of the Order of Franz Joseph
Members of the Privy Council of Ireland
People educated at Cheltenham College
People from Aigburth
People of the Easter Rising
Military personnel from Liverpool